Habermehl Peak is a peak  high,  south of Gessner Peak in the northeast part of the Mühlig-Hofmann Mountains of Queen Maud Land, Antarctica. It was discovered by the Third German Antarctic Expedition (1938–1939), led by Captain Alfred Ritscher, and named for Richard Habermehl, the director of the German Weather Service. It was remapped from air photos taken by the Sixth Norwegian Antarctic Expedition, 1958–59.

References

Mountains of Queen Maud Land
Princess Astrid Coast